Ibrahim ibn Khalid al-Kalbi al-Baghdadi (764–854) better known as Abu Thawr was an early scholar of Islam. He was born in 170 AH.

A personal school was built by the followers of Abu Thawr which disappeared by the 4th century Hijra.
Abu Thawr was asked, "Who are the Qadariyyah?" and he replied:

" The Qadariyyah are those who say Allaah did not create the actions of the servants and that Allah did not decree acts of disobedience for the servants and that He did not create them (the acts of disobedience). Therefore these Qadariyyah are not be prayed behind, nor are their sick to be visited and nor are their funerals to be attended. Their repentance from this saying should be sought. If they repent (then so) and if not then their necks are to be struck."

Notes

References
 Wael B. Hallaq. The Origins and Evolution of Islamic Law. (Cambridge: Cambridge University Press, 2005) p. 168

760s births
854 deaths
9th-century Muslim scholars of Islam
Atharis
Shafi'is
Grand Muftis of Iraq